The 2003 Appalachian State Mountaineers football team represented Appalachian State University as a member of the Southern Conference (SoCON) during in the 2003 NCAA Division I-AA football season. Led by 15th-year head coach Jerry Moore, the Mountaineers compiled an overall record of 7–4 with a mark of 6–2 in conference play, placing second in the SoCon. The team finished the season with a 26–18 victory over rival Western Carolina in the Battle for the Old Mountain Jug. Home games were played at Kidd Brewer Stadium in Boone, North Carolina.

Schedule

References

Appalachian State
Appalachian State Mountaineers football seasons
Appalachian State Mountaineers football